Plestiodon lotus is a species of lizard which is endemic to Mexico.

References

lotus
Reptiles of Mexico
Reptiles described in 2017